For Honor is an action game developed and published by Ubisoft. The game allows players to play the roles of historical forms of soldiers and warriors such as knights, samurai, vikings, controlled using a third-person perspective. The game was developed primarily by Ubisoft Montreal and released worldwide for PlayStation 4, Windows, and Xbox One in 2017.

For Honor received generally favorable reviews, with the difficult and original combat mechanics being highlighted.

Gameplay

For Honor is an action game set during a medieval, fantasy setting.  Players can play as a character from one of five different factions, namely the Iron Legion (Knights), the Warborn (Vikings), the Dawn Empire (Samurai), and the Wu Lin (Ancient Chinese). The fifth faction was added in January 2022 and is named the Outlander faction which only has three characters at this time, The Pirate based around a stereotypical pirate lord from the Golden Age of Piracy, The Medjay, an Ancient Egyptian warrior and the Afeera, influenced by the Abbasid dynasty culture and the Mamluks. The Wu Lin faction was added in the Marching Fire expansion in October 2018. The Vanguard class is described as "well-balanced" and has excellent offense and defense. The Assassin class is fast and efficient in dueling enemies, but the class deals much less damage to multiple enemies. The Heavies (Tanks) are more resistant to damage and are suitable for holding capture points, though their attacks are slow. The last class, known as "Hybrid", is a combination of two of the three types, and is capable of using uncommon skills.

All heroes are unique and have their own weapons, skills, and fighting styles. Players fight against their opponents with their class-specific melee weapons. When players perform certain actions, such as killing multiple enemies consecutively, they gain Feats, which are additional perks. These perks allow players to gain additional points and strengths, call in a barrage of arrows or a catapult attack, or heal themselves. In most missions, players are accompanied by numerous AI minions. They are significantly weaker than the player character, and do not pose much threat.

A tactical combat system, known as "Art of Battle", is initiated when the player encounters other players or player-like AI in the multiplayer or higher health AI in the campaign. Players enter a dueling mode with them wherein players aim at their opponent with their weapon. Players then can choose how to place and position their weapons from three directions (from above, the right, and the left) when they are attacking their enemies. By observing on-screen hints and the movements of their opponents, which reflect their respective attack position, players are able to choose the correct position to block the other players' attacks. Players also have other special abilities, which vary depending on the character they choose, such as barging into enemies with their own shoulders and performing back-stepping swipes. The strength of each attack can also be decided by players. The system aims at allowing players to "feel the weight of the weapon in [their] hand".

Multiplayer
Similar to the single-player campaign, the multiplayer modes feature perks, AI minions, and the Art of Battle system. As the competitive multiplayer modes feature a structure similar to that of shooters, the creative director of the game called For Honor a "shooter with swords". Friendly fire is also featured in the game. Players can cause damage to their own teammates if they accidentally or intentionally hit them with their blades. The multiplayer aspect also allows players to customize their characters. For instance, the armor that the characters wear can be changed and modified. There are seven game modes: There is also a ranked duel game mode that is currently in beta:

 Dominion: Dominion is a four-versus-four multiplayer mode in which players must capture and hold multiple zones in a battlefield. Points are earned through occupying the zones and killing enemy minions that fight at point B. Players earn double points for staying on points A and C. When one team earns 1000 points, the other team starts to ‘break’ meaning each player on that team cannot respawn unless revived by another teammate. Once one of the teams are breaking the opposing team must eliminate all of their players to secure victory.
 Brawl: In this two-versus-two multiplayer mode, one duo must eliminate the other completely, best out of 5 games in order to win.
 Duel: Duel is a one-versus-one multiplayer mode in which a player must win the best out of 5 games in order to win.
Ranked Duel: Ranked duel is a one-versus-one multiplayer mode in which players start in a qualifying stage, where they will have to complete 8 matches before they are placed into one of five rank tiers, Bronze, Silver, Gold, Platinum, and Diamond. Players placement depends on how many wins or losses they receive in the 8 qualifying matches. After players are placed within their respective rank tier, players will be pitted against other players within a similar rank tier.
 Skirmish: Skirmish is a four-versus-four multiplayer mode in which players gain points while killing enemies. When one team earns enough points, they must eliminate the players from the other team and win the match.
 Elimination: A team of players must eliminate the entire team of opponent players in this four-versus-four multiplayer mode. The team that still has remaining warriors will automatically win the match.
 Tribute: A four-versus-four multiplayer mode where teams attempt to steal offerings and place them on their shrine. Each of the three offering gives the team a special power-up. The team to capture all three and defend them until the timer ends wins or the team with the most offerings at the end of the battle timer wins.
 Breach: A four-versus-four multiplayer mode where the attacker's goal is to kill the Commander while the defenders must successfully stop the attackers. The attackers must complete a series of objectives such as leading the battering ram to each of the two gates, breaking them both down and, ultimately, slaying the Commander; on the contrary, the defenders must prevent the attackers from completing any objectives.

The Faction War
Each online multiplayer match awards War Assets based on the outcome and the player's performance. These War Assets are then deployed in the Faction War – which stretches across all platforms – where they are used either to defend an allied territory or conquer a neighbouring one occupied by an enemy faction, with the most war assets deployed in a given territory determining the victor. Territories controlled are updated every six hours, while rounds last for two weeks and seasons last for ten weeks (five rounds). As the war progresses and territories change, the changing front will determine which maps that are played and their appearance (each map has variants depending on whether it is under Samurai, Knight or Viking control.) Players who have distinguished themselves and helped their faction gain and defend ground earn higher quality equipment as spoils of war after each round and each season. After a season ends, the map is reset and a new season begins after an off-season period, but the outcome of the previous season impacts the story background of the new season.<ref>[https://www.youtube.com/watch?v=NUqYs3hBh7o For Honor: "What is the Faction War?"] Ubisoft US on YouTube</ref>

 Heroes 
There are currently five factions in For Honor: Knights, Vikings, and Samurai, with a fourth faction, the Wu Lin, having been added with the Marching Fire expansion. The fifth faction, called The Outlanders, are a group of warriors introduced in Y5S4 who have no cultural links to the previous factions. There are 9 combatants in the Knight faction, 7 in the Viking faction, 8 in the Samurai faction, 5 in Wu Lin faction, and 3 in The Outlanders faction, making for a grand total of 32 currently playable heroes, with a further additional character for the Outlanders being confirmed to be in development for Year 6. Each hero has their own unique weapons and fighting styles.

Synopsis
Setting
After a natural catastrophe pitted the most fearsome warriors against one another in a fight for resources and territory, the bloodthirsty warlord Apollyon believes the people of the Knights, Vikings, and Samurai have grown weak and wants to create an age of all-out war through manipulation of each faction. To this end the perspectives of characters within each faction are shown as events unfold, battles are waged, and agendas are created as Apollyon works to ensure continuous sparks of conflict between the Legion, the Warborn, and the Chosen from the Myre. With a later DLC, the Wu-Lin, based on Chinese culture, were added, while in-game lore links the Romans fighting for the Legion to a fifth Roman-based faction not present in the game.

Plot
The warmonger Apollyon takes control of the knights of the Blackstone Legion after murdering her rivals, who fight for the people of the land of Ashfeld, allowing her to sow the seeds of perpetual war and create stronger men to rule over the weak. During the Blackstone Legion's attempt to bring a dishonorable lord-turned-mercenary, Hervis Daubeny, to justice, his second-in-command, known as the Warden, helps to stop the Blackstone siege and battles the champion of the Blackstone knights. Upon defeating a Blackstone Legion captain, Ademar, the Warden is made a knight of the Legion by Holden Cross, Apollyon's lieutenant, and leaves with him. During his/her time in Apollyon's army, the Warden helps to defend against the Viking raiders of the Warborn, but soon realizes shortly after meeting with Apollyon that she cares nothing about protecting people and seeks to manipulate her enemies into endless battles. Starting with the Vikings, Apollyon and her warriors including Holden Cross, the Warden and fellow lieutenants Stone and Mercy, attack their settlements and sack their strongholds in the northern land of Valkenheim, leaving only enough food and supplies to fight over, and sparing those who would eagerly fight for those scraps or are strong enough to do so.

Afterwards, in Valkenheim, the Viking clans fight among themselves, killing one another for the dwindling scraps left by Apollyon. This continues until a powerful warrior known as Raider comes down from the mountains, and begins uniting the warriors of the various clans under the Warborn banner, alongside Warlord friend Stigandr, Valkyrie warrior Runa and Berserker Helvar, first by killing the brutal raider Ragnar, who steals what little remains from those who cannot feed themselves, and then Siv the Ruthless, who seeks to conquer and plunder their own people. After killing their rivals, Raider's rapidly growing army retake a Warborn stronghold from knights of Apollyon's army, and then set out to the land of the Myre to raid the Dawn Empire of the Chosen, a group of powerful Samurai, to resupply and feed their people. The Raider then leads the assault on the Samurai, kills the Samurai General, Tozen, and causes the Samurai to retreat back to their greatest city. In the chaos, Apollyon kills the Dawn Empire's ruler and his daimyōs that refuse to fight.

Into this chaos is brought the Orochi warrior known as the Emperor's champion, the strongest and most fearsome warrior in the Dawn Empire. The champion was imprisoned for speaking out of turn and was freed during the chaos of the Viking raid. The Orochi helps to push back the Vikings, but fails to prevent Apollyon from riding through the chaos and murdering the Imperial family, forcing the Daimyos to fight one another for supreme rulership as Emperor of the Dawn Empire. After learning of the devastation the Viking raid caused, the Orochi, fellow samurai Ayu, the Shugoki Okuma and Nobushi Momiji attempt to reunite the Daimyos under one banner, using Apollyon as a common enemy to rally against. The Emperor's Champion infiltrates the Emperor's palace with Momiji and confronts Seijuro, the Daimyo who took Apollyon's offer to become Emperor. After defeating Seijuro, the champion convinces him to join him against Apollyon. It is also during this time that the Emperor's Champion learns of Apollyon's manipulations of the various factions and rallies allies to stop Apollyon, invading Ashfeld to attack Blackstone Fortress. During a scouting mission with Momiji, the Orochi is met by the Warden, now leading the rebellious Iron Legion against Apollyon with Holden Cross, Stone and Mercy by his/her side, and after dueling him/her, realizes they are allied against the same enemy. Both armies besiege the castle on separate fronts, with the Orochi searching for Apollyon. After finding Apollyon, the Orochi fights with and kills her, but not before learning that she wanted to create eternal war to weed out the weak and create the strongest of men, making them evermore bloodthirsty. Despite her death, Apollyon got what she wanted: an age of bloodthirsty wolves.

In the aftermath, the armies of all three factions attacking the Blackstone Fortress; Knight, Samurai and Viking alike all turn on each other, resulting in a war lasting seven years. Realizing the war's futility, the Warden, now leader of the Iron Legion, sends Holden Cross to meet with the jarl of the vikings, Stigandr, and the samurai Ayu. Though all three realize that the prospect of peace may be futile, they all agree that peace is worth fighting for and striving for it will make for an unforgettable tale.

DevelopmentFor Honor was developed by Ubisoft Montreal. Blue Byte developed the game's PC version. It was announced during Ubisoft's E3 2015 press conference. A CGI trailer and a gameplay demo were shown during the conference. Development of the game began in 2012. For Honor was the company's first attempt at developing a strategy-action game. The structure of the game is inspired by shooter games. The game was released worldwide for PlayStation 4, Windows, and Xbox One on February 14, 2017. The game's original score was written and produced by film composers Danny Bensi, Saunder Jurriaans and Owen Wallis. A 20-track original soundtrack released alongside the game on February 14. On 27 July 2018, the game was announced to be joining the Xbox Games With Gold program.

The documentary Playing Hard shows the development of the game, from an idea of Jason Vandenberghe up to release.

The game features a Dolby Atmos soundtrack.

The Warden was later included as a playable DLC character in SNK's 2019 fighting game Samurai Shodown on June 24, 2020.

From October 21, 2021, to November 11, 2021, a Dead by Daylight crossover event called Survivors of the Fog was held. The event featured Dead by Daylight-inspired cosmetic items and a limited-time game mode that featured one of the game's original characters, the Trapper, as an AI-controlled enemy.

ReceptionFor Honor received "generally favorable" reviews, according to video game review aggregator Metacritic.PC Gamer awarded it a score of 74/100, saying "A tense, tactical medieval brawler that will reward anyone with the patience and will to master it."Eurogamer ranked the game 25th on their list of the "Top 50 Games of 2017". The game won the People's Choice Award for "Best Fighting Game" in IGN's Best of 2017 Awards.

Sales
In Japan, For Honor'' debuted as the top-selling video game during its first week of release (February 13 to February 19, 2017), selling 40,062 copies, according to Media Create. In the U.S., it was the top-selling video game of February 2017, according to The NPD Group's tracking of retail and some digital sales. In the UK, it was the best-selling game during the week ending February 18, 2017, according to Chart-Track data, which excludes digital sales. The game ranked seventh worldwide in digital sales of console games during February 2017, according to SuperData Research's digital sales report, selling over 700,000 digital copies for all three platforms.

Accolades

Notes

References

External links
 
 For Honor at Ubisoft

2017 video games
Action video games
Alternate history video games
Hack and slash games
Japan in non-Japanese culture
Multiplayer and single-player video games
PlayStation 4 games
PlayStation 4 Pro enhanced games
Ubisoft games
Video games about samurai
Video games using Havok
Video games developed in Canada
Video games featuring protagonists of selectable gender
Video games set in historical China
Video games set in feudal Japan
Video games set in the Viking Age
Video games set in the Middle Ages
Windows games
Xbox One games
Xbox One X enhanced games
Video games with downloadable content
Video games containing battle passes
Blue Byte games